Juraj Šiška (born 17 May 1996) is a Slovak professional ice hockey forward for HKM Zvolen of the Slovak Extraliga.

Career
Šiška began his career with HK Nitra's academy and made his senior debut for the team during the 2012–13 season. He then went on to the Canadian Hockey League and was drafted 9th overall by the Saint John Sea Dogs of the Quebec Major Junior Hockey League in the 2013 CHL Import Draft. However, he would return to Slovakia to rehabilitate neck and back injuries and would eventually sit out the entire 2013–14 season. He spent the following season with the Sea Dogs before returning to Slovakia.

In the tail-end of the 2015–16 season, Šiška moved to HC Slovan Bratislava of the Kontinental Hockey League and would play 39 games for the team over parts of two seasons before rejoining HK Nitra in 2017.

Career statistics

Regular season and playoffs

International

References

External links

 

1996 births
Living people
HK Levice players
HK Nitra players
Saint John Sea Dogs players
Slovak ice hockey forwards
HC Slovan Bratislava players
Sportspeople from Nitra
HK Trnava players
HKM Zvolen players
HC Nové Zámky players
Competitors at the 2019 Winter Universiade
Universiade medalists in ice hockey
Universiade silver medalists for Slovakia
Slovak expatriate ice hockey players in Canada